Superior Avenue is the main wide thoroughfare and part of U.S. Route 6 in Ohio in Downtown Cleveland, the largest and most populated city of Northeast Ohio. Superior runs through the central hub of Cleveland, Public Square. However, the only traffic that can go through the square is bus, bike, and pedestrian transportation. In 2016, the city of Cleveland completed renovation of the Public Square green space and it was decided that no civilian vehicular traffic should be allowed to traverse the park area. Public Square is the "hub" because all of the main streets in downtown jut out from this central greenery. To the east and west, Superior, to the north and south Ontario Street as all the north-south roads are Streets in Cleveland (which goes back to the 1906 Street Plan Decision, and diagonally to the southwest, Euclid Avenue.

Superior Avenue connects the east and west sides of the most populated downtown in Ohio. To the west, Superior Avenue connects to the Detroit Avenue extension which starts at the terminus of Superior, the Detroit-Superior Bridge that crosses over the Cuyahoga River into Ohio City. Detroit then runs through the entire west side of Cleveland, through the inner ring suburbs of Lakewood, Rocky River, the outer ring suburb of Westlake and on into the exurbs of Lorain County.

To the east this main drag runs through the length of several downtown districts out into the St. Clair-Superior and Glenville neighborhoods of the city. It continues through the suburbs of East Cleveland, Cleveland Heights, and terminates as it dead ends into the eastside boulevard, Mayfield Road. Unlike the westside which is fairly straight as it follows closely to the shore line of Lake Erie, the east side pattern of Superior twists and winds its way through the streets and communities of Greater Cleveland.

An address along Superior, especially downtown, is considered to be extremely exclusive, akin to Wilshire Boulevard in Los Angeles or Wall Street and/or Park Avenue in New York City. In fact, a number of important businesses, offices, and government institutions are located along Superior Avenue solely because this is the case.

Businesses, buildings, and government agencies
1111 Superior Avenue
1717 East Ninth Building
AmTrust Financial Building
Asian Town Center
Bohn Towers
Carl B. Stokes United States Courthouse Tower
Cleveland Arcade
Cleveland Cliffs Natural Resources
Cleveland Fire Training Academy
Cleveland Flea Market
Cleveland Metropolitan School District Professional Center
Cleveland Public Library Main Branch 
Cleveland Public Library Stokes Wing at CPL
Cleveland Renaissance Hotel
Daffy Dan's, The Creative Studios of Daffy Dan, East 21st and Superior Avenue. daffydan.com 
Federal Reserve Bank of Cleveland
Fifth Third Center
Forest Hill Reserve Park
Frank J. Lausche State Office Building
Hot Cards
Howard M. Metzenbaum United States Courthouse
Huntington Building
IBM of Cleveland
Lake View Cemetery
Oswald Companies
Perry-Payne Building
The Plain Dealer Plaza
Red Space 
Reserve Square
Rockefeller Building (Cleveland)
St.John's Cathedral
St. Peter's Catholic Church
Superior Building
Tower Press Building
The Virgil E. Brown Center

See also
Euclid Avenue, Cleveland
Nine-Twelve District
University Circle
Warehouse District

References

Streets in Cleveland
U.S. Route 6